Phước Hải is a township (thị trấn) in  Đất Đỏ District, Bà Rịa–Vũng Tàu province, Vietnam.

The township was founded in 2006 from 1,655.58 hectares with 20,923 inhabitants of the commune of Phước Hải. The neighboring communes arei: Lộc An to the east (district of Đất Đỏ); townlet of Long Hải to the west (district of Long Điền); South China Sea to the south, to the north it borders Long Mỹ and Phước Hội in Đất Đỏ District.

References

Populated places in Bà Rịa-Vũng Tàu province
Communes of Bà Rịa-Vũng Tàu province
Townships in Vietnam